Luciano Andrade Rissutt (born 22 January 1977), or simply Rissutt, is a Brazilian footballer.

Rissutt started his career at Brazilian lower division. In 2004, he left for Ponte Preta of Campeonato Brasileiro Série A. In May 2005 he signed a new contract until December 2006. In early 2006 he left for Fluminense and in January 2007 left for Vitória Guimarães and won promotion back to top division as Liga de Honra runner-up. In the next season he signed a 2-year deal with Boavista of Portuguese Liga, but left the club after relegated.

In 2008, he trailed at Atlético Paranaense
In 2010, he returned to São Paulo for Ituano, signed a contract until the end of 2010 Campeonato Paulista.

References

External links
 Profile at Portuguese Liga 
 
 Profile at CBF 
 
 
 

Brazilian footballers
Brazilian expatriate footballers
Clube Atlético Juventus players
Mogi Mirim Esporte Clube players
Sport Club do Recife players
Associação Portuguesa de Desportos players
Associação Atlética Ponte Preta players
Fluminense FC players
Vitória S.C. players
Boavista F.C. players
Ituano FC players
Primeira Liga players
Expatriate footballers in Portugal
Brazilian expatriate sportspeople in Portugal
Association football fullbacks
Sportspeople from Salvador, Bahia
1977 births
Living people